Pedro Joaquim Furtado Moreno (born 20 July 1986), simply known as Patas is a Cape Verdean professional footballer who plays for Grupo Sportivo de Loures in Portugal mainly as a midfielder.

Club career 
Born in Tarrafal, Patas kicked off his career in 2007 with local Cape Verde sides. In 2010, he came to Portugal signing with Águias Moradal in the third tier. After spending two successful season, he joined  Benfica Castelo Branco in the same tier in 2012.

In 2014, he signed for Segunda Liga club Santa Clara on a two-year contract.

References

External links 
 
 

1986 births
People from Tarrafal
Living people
Cape Verdean footballers
Association football midfielders
GS Loures players
Estrela dos Amadores players
Cape Verdean expatriate footballers
Expatriate footballers in Portugal
Sport Benfica e Castelo Branco players
C.D. Santa Clara players
S.C.U. Torreense players
Liga Portugal 2 players